Roshangiri Union is a union of Fatikchhari Upazila of Chittagong District.

Geography
Area: 1,723 acres (6.97 km2).

Location
 North: Lelang Union 
 East:  Samitirhat Union
 South: Hathazari Upazila
 West:  Daulatpur Union

Population
At the 1991 Bangladesh census, Roshangiri Union had a population of 7,886.

References
 Roshangiri Union details, lcgbangladesh.org

Unions of Fatikchhari Upazila